Preissac is a municipality in the Canadian province of Quebec, located in the Abitibi Regional County Municipality. The village of Preissac itself is located at the north end of Lake Preissac.

It is named after Lambert Preissac de Cadeihan, a lieutenant in the Régiment de Berry that was part of General Montcalm's army.

Chronology 

 1906 : Opening of the first molybdenite mine
 1916 : Establishment of the township municipality (canton) of Preissac.
 1934 : Arrival of the first settlers under the Vautrin Plan
 1936: Start of construction of the St-Raphael de Preissac church.
 January 1, 1979 : The township (canton) of Preissac becomes the municipality of Preissac.
 1979 : Opening of the Bousquet mine
1980 : Opening of the Doyon mine
1988 : Opening of Dumagami mine (later renamed La Ronde) operated by Agnico-Eagle which was the source in the 1990s of more than half of Quebec's gold production

Demographics
Population trend:
 Population in 2021: 914 (2016 to 2021 population change: 9.5%)
 Population in 2016: 835 
 Population in 2011: 786 
 Population in 2006: 726
 Population in 2001: 684
 Population in 1996: 619
 Population in 1991: 529

Private dwellings occupied by usual residents: 430 (total dwellings: 527)

Mother tongue:
 English as first language: 1.4%
 French as first language: 97.2%
 English and French as first language: 0%
 Other as first language: 1.4%

Municipal council
 Mayor:  Huguette Saucier, elected November 1, 2009
 Councillors: France Beaumier, Léonard Brisson, Line Lafleur, Pauline Marchand, Jules Pelchat, Huguette Saucier

References

External links 
 Municipalité de Preissac
 Domaine Preissac (pourvoirie de la municipalité)

Municipalities in Quebec
Incorporated places in Abitibi-Témiscamingue